Kayra or Kaira (Old Turkic: 𐰴𐰖𐰺𐰀) is creator god in Turkic mythology. He is the god who planted the tree of life called Ulukayın. He is the supreme god of the pantheon and the son of sky deity named Tengri. This son, Kara Han (the black king or ruler of the land – Kara may mean land, earth, black or in a sense strong, powerful), left his father's home in the heaven and went to live in the underworld. On occasion, identified as Kara-Khan (black king), he was the primordial god and his father was the ancordial god called Tengri.

Etymology
The name of this deity is found in several forms, as is that of his opponent. "Kayra-Khan" may be translated as "merciful king", while the form "Kara Han" signifies "black king". For this reason, authority on Turkic Mythology Deniz Karakurt, considers Kara-Han and Kayra-Han to be two different deities. Furthermore, the Turkish word kara can mean both black and land, with the result that Kara Han can mean not only 'Black (Dark) Ruler' but also 'Ruler of the Land'.

God of Creation
In ancient Turkic  belief known as Altai myth of creation, Tangri (God) Kara Han is neither male nor female nor even human in form, but a pure-white goose that flies constantly over an endless expanse of water (time), the benign creator of all that is, including the other, lesser gods. Among all Altaic Tartars the dualistic division is most clear (Ulgen and Erlik), and the highest god, Tengre Kaira Khan, is a good power. But before Ak Ana appears to urge it to create, Kara-han becomes anxious, creation occurring in a context of loneliness, turmoil and fear: the water becomes turbulent, but it reassures itself that it "need not fear" (the implication of such self-reassurance being that it is indeed afraid). Supreme being in the universe it created, Kara-han is the ruler of the three realms of air, water and land, seated on the seventeenth level of the universe, from which it determines the fate of its creation. After creating the universe it planted the nine-boughed tree of life, from the branches of which came the ancestors of humans. Thus emerged the nine races (nine clans).
It has three sons: Ulgan, Mergen and Kyzaghan.

A Tuvinian / Soyoth legend, told as follows: The giant turtle which supported the earth moved, which caused the cosmic ocean to begin flooding the earth. An old man who had guessed something like this would happen, built a raft. Boarded it with his family, and he was saved. When the waters receded, the raft was left on a high wooded mountain, where, it is said, it remains today. After the flood Kaira-Khan created everything around the world. Among other things, he taught people how to make Araq (some kind of liquor).

See also
 Bai-Ulgan
 Turul

References

Bibliography 
 Türk Mitolojisi, Murat Uraz, 
 Türk Mitolojisi Ansiklopedik Sözlük, Celal Beydili, Yurt Yayınevi (Page-305, Kayrakan)

External links 
 Kayra Han

Turkic deities
Creator gods
Siberian deities